The Netherlands Environmental Assessment Agency ( - abbr. PBL) is a Dutch research institute that advises the Dutch government on environmental policy and regional planning issues. The research fields include sustainable development, energy and climate change, biodiversity, transport, land use, and air quality. It is one of three applied policy research institutes of the Dutch government, the other two being Centraal Planbureau (CPB), and The Netherlands Institute for Social Research (SCP). Since November 2015 Hans Mommaas is director of the Netherlands Environmental Assessment Agency.

The PBL was created on May 15, 2008, by merging the Netherlands Environmental Agency (MNP) with the Netherlands Institute for Spatial Research (RPB). The English name for the new organization was borrowed from the MNP, which was part of the Netherlands National Institute for Public Health and the Environment (RIVM) until May 1, 2005. It is currently an agency of the Dutch Ministry of Infrastructure and the Environment (IenM, Ministerie van Infrastructuur en Milieu).

The Netherlands Environmental Assessment Agency is located in The Hague and employs approximately 300 people.

References

External links
Netherlands Environmental Assessment Agency

Research institutes in the Netherlands
Environment of the Netherlands
Government agencies of the Netherlands
Environmental research institutes
Environmental agencies